Abalá is a town and the municipal seat of the Abalá Municipality, Yucatán in Mexico. As of 2010, the town has a population of 1,890.

Demographics

References

Populated places in Yucatán
Municipality seats in Yucatán